Dhonielle Clayton is an American author and chief operating officer of We Need Diverse Books.

Life and career 
Clayton was born in Washington, D.C. She went to Our Lady Of Good Counsel in Wheaton Maryland. She graduated with a B.A. from Wake Forest University in 2005, a M.A. from Hollins University in 2008, and a M.F.A. in creative writing from The New School in 2012.

She is president and owner of Cake Creative, a boutique book packager. She co-authored the instant New York Times bestselling book Blackout with Tiffany D. Jackson, Angie Thomas, Nic Stone, Ashley Woodfolk, and Nicola Yoon, and it's currently slated to become a movie and TV show produced by the Obamas for Netflix. She also co-authored the Tiny Pretty Things series with Sona Charaipotra. The series debuted in 2015 and follows three teenage dance students at New York's American Ballet Company. Kirkus referred to volume one as "a page-turner with heart." In 2020, Tiny Pretty Things made its debut on Netflix as a series.

Clayton's interest as a teenager in magazines, beauty and how they affected the way she viewed herself later served as inspirations for her debut novel, The Belles, released in February 2018. The fantasy young adult novel centers a 16-year-old girl and her sisters, tasked with restoring beauty to a colorless grey world. The book was a New York Times bestseller and was named a Best Book of 2018 by Kirkus.

Clayton is Chief Operating Officer of We Need Diverse Books, which seeks to increase representations of marginalized groups in children and young adult literature. She also works as a sensitivity reader for children's literature and works to identify stereotypes or inauthentic portrayals of Black characters. She has also advocated for books to better represent people of color.

In 2019, Clayton attracted criticism for negative Tweets about a student of Northern State University, who had advocated for the inclusion of three books by persons of colour, including Bryan Stevenson's memoir Just Mercy about racial injustice, instead of a YA novel by Sarah Dessen, in the university's "Common Reads" program. Clayton later deleted the tweets.

In 2019, Clayton and Zoraida Córdova started a podcast together called Deadline City. Together they co-host episodes and talk about publishing topics and their own experiences in publishing.

Awards

Published works

Novels 

 Blackout (2021)
The Rumor Game with Sona Charaipotra (2022)
The Marvellers (2022)

Tiny Pretty Things series 

 Tiny Pretty Things with Sona Charaipotra (2015)
 Shiny Broken Pieces with Sona Charaipotra (2016)

The Mirror series 

 Shattered Midnight (2022)

The Belles series 

 The Belles (2018)
 The Everlasting Rose (2019)

Short stories 

 "When the Moonlight Isn't Enough" in The Radical Element, edited by Jessica Spotswood (2018)
 "The Need for Kisses" in Well-Read Black Girl: Finding Our Stories, Discovering Ourselves, edited by Glory Edim (2018)
 "The Way We Love Here" in  Meet Cute: Some People Are Destined to Meet (2018)
 "You Know Nothing About Love" in Unbroken: 13 Stories Starring Disabled Teens, edited by Marieke Nijkamp (2018)
 "Hearts Turned to Ash" in A Phoenix First Must Burn, edited by Patrice Caldwell (2020)
 "The House of Black Sapphires" in Vampires Never Get Old: Tales with Fresh Bite, edited by Zoraida Córdova and Natalie C. Parker (2020)

Anthologies edited 
 A Universe of Wishes: We Need Diverse Books Anthology (2020)
Blackout (2021)

References

External links 
 Official website

Living people
21st-century African-American women writers
21st-century African-American writers
21st-century American novelists
African-American novelists
American chief operating officers
American women novelists
Hollins University alumni
The New School alumni
Wake Forest University alumni
Year of birth missing (living people)
Writers from Washington, D.C.
African-American business executives
21st-century American women writers